Baculoviral IAP repeat-containing protein 1 is a protein that in humans is encoded by the NAIP gene.

This gene is part of a 500 kb inverted duplication on chromosome 5q13. This duplicated region contains at least four genes and repetitive elements which make it prone to rearrangements and deletions. The repetitiveness and complexity of the sequence have also caused difficulty in determining the organization of this genomic region. This copy of the gene is full length; additional copies with truncations and internal deletions are also present in this region of chromosome 5q13. It is thought that this gene is a modifier of spinal muscular atrophy caused by mutations in a neighboring gene, SMN1.
The protein encoded by this gene contains regions of homology to two baculovirus inhibitor of apoptosis proteins, and it is able to suppress apoptosis induced by various signals. Alternatively spliced transcript variants encoding distinct isoforms have been found for this gene.

References

Further reading

External links
 
 

Human proteins
NOD-like receptors